Joe Cobden (born October 7, 1978 in Halifax, Nova Scotia) is a Canadian actor and filmmaker. Joe started performing at age 10 as a street vaudevillian, touring festivals worldwide. In 1996, at age 17, Joe enrolled at Concordia University’s Theatre Performance Programme, in Montréal. 

Joe played triplets in the television series Living in Your Car, for which he received a Gemini Award nomination for Best Supporting Actor in a Comedy Series at the 26th Gemini Awards in 2011, as well as the lead role in the movie Peepers, for which he was nominated for a 2011 Canadian Comedy Award (best actor). He was the sole voice role in the animated television series Knuckleheads, for which he played over 60 characters was a Canadian Screen Award nominee for Best Performance in an Animated Program or Series at the 5th Canadian Screen Awards in 2017. 

As a director, Joe made six shorts for Sesame Street, musical videos for Plants and Animals, Barr Brothers, and Mike O’Brien, and short films with premieres at SXSW, TIFF, and Palm Springs. His choreographic films have won awards, including at Cinédans and the Cabbagetown Film Festival. 

Joe was the showrunner of a sketch comedy show for Quibi, produced by Abso Lutely and Supper Club. The show, Toothpix was based on a series of absurd video Yelp “reviews” of LA restaurants. 

In 2021 Joe made The Hundos - a comedy fitness series, with his mother Jane. 

Joe is the writer and lead actor of four musicals with Canadian musician Socalled. All premiered at Kampnagel in Hamburg.

Joe was nominated for a Dora Mavor Moore Award in 2015 for the lead role in the Tarragon Theatre production of Ibsen’s An Enemy of the People.

Filmography

Film

Television

References

External links

1978 births
Living people
Canadian male film actors
Canadian male television actors
Canadian male stage actors
Canadian male voice actors
Male actors from Halifax, Nova Scotia
Film directors from Nova Scotia